50 South Sixth is a 404-ft (123 m) high-rise office building in Minneapolis, Minnesota. It was completed in 2001 and has 30 floors. It is the 18th-tallest building in the city. A skyway connects this building to the 15 Building, Renaissance Square, Minneapolis City Center, and Gaviidae Common. The Minnesota Law Center once occupied this site. The  Class A office tower is managed by Newmark Knight Frank.

See also
List of tallest buildings in Minneapolis

References
Emporis
Hines
Twincities Business Journal

Skyscraper office buildings in Minneapolis
Office buildings completed in 2001
Skidmore, Owings & Merrill buildings